The Chester Transportation Center is a SEPTA bus and train station in Chester, Pennsylvania. The outside portion of the ground level serves SEPTA City Transit Division Route 37, and Suburban Transit Division Routes 109, 113, 114, 117, 118, and 119.

Above the building of the transportation center is the train station. The tracks run over the building. The station is served by the Wilmington/Newark Line. The line offers southbound service to Wilmington and Newark, Delaware and northbound service to Philadelphia. 

This station is located at 6th and Welsh Streets, Chester, PA 19013.

History
Chester station was built by the Pennsylvania Railroad in 1903. While in the 1940s Chester was a common intermediate stop for services between New York and Washington, by the 1970s this was reduced to just one daily train; the station was also served by Amtrak's Chesapeake, which stopped both ways between Philadelphia and Washington during its existence from 1978 through 1983. 

All long-distance services have since stopped calling at Chester. PRR/PC/Conrail local trains to Marcus Hook/Wilmington/Newark continued until SEPTA took them over in 1983.

Station layout
Chester has two low-level side platforms with walkways connecting passengers to the inner tracks. Amtrak's Northeast Corridor lines bypass the station via the inner tracks.

See also
New Brunswick station - built according to similar blueprints at about the same time

References

External links

SEPTA – Chester Transportation Center
Original Chester PRR Station
 Welsh Street entrance from Google Maps Street View
 Avenue of the States entrance from Google Maps Street View

Former Amtrak stations in Pennsylvania
SEPTA Regional Rail stations
Stations on the Northeast Corridor
Railway stations in Delaware County, Pennsylvania
Railway stations in the United States opened in 1903
Chester, Pennsylvania
1903 establishments in Pennsylvania
Former Pennsylvania Railroad stations
Wilmington/Newark Line